The Scout and Guide movement in Rwanda is served by two organisations:
 Association des Guides du Rwanda, member of the World Association of Girl Guides and Girl Scouts
 Rwanda Scouts Association, member of the World Organization of the Scout Movement

See also